The Shadow Between is a 1920 British silent crime film directed by George Dewhurst and starring Doris Lloyd, Lewis Dayton and Simeon Stuart. It was adapted from the 1908 novel by Silas Hocking. The screenplay concerns a young Australian girl who travels to Britain after the death of her English father, who was a miner.

Cast
 Doris Lloyd ...  Marian West 
 Lewis Dayton ...  Clement Mawgan 
 Simeon Stuart ...  Lord Grovely 
 Cherry Winter ...  Esther Mawgan 
 Gertrude Sterroll ...  Mrs. Mawgan 
 Wallace Bosco ...  Dick West
 Billie Berkeley ...  Julia Treven 
 Horace Corbyn ...  Mr. Jackson 
 W. Lane-Bayliff ...  Mr. Evans

References

External links

1920 films
British crime films
British silent feature films
Films directed by George Dewhurst
Films based on British novels
British black-and-white films
1920 crime films
1920s English-language films
1920s British films